The Basel Convention Coordinating Centre for the African Region in Nigeria (BCCC Africa) is a regional centre of the Basel Convention. It is located along Ijoma Road, inside the main campus of the University of Ibadan, Ibadan, Nigeria.
It has the vision of strengthening countries in the African Region in the Environmentally Sound Management (ESM) of Hazardous Waste. The Coordinating Centre in Nigeria aims at fast-tracking the implementation of the Basel Convention in the African Region.
The Centre is aimed at African countries implement the Basel Convention and its amendments. It also tries to inform these countries about chemicals and hazardous wastes issues. The Centre receives financial assistance from the Nigerian Government, and the Basel Convention Trust fund.

References 

Organizations based in Nigeria
Hazardous waste